Naukograd (also technopole), meaning "science city", is a formal term for towns with high concentrations of research and development facilities in Russia and the Soviet Union, some specifically built by the Soviet Union for these purposes. Some of the towns were secret and were part of a larger system of closed cities in the USSR, many built by forced labour from the Soviet Gulag. In the Russian Federation in post-Soviet times, the term is used generally for about seventy towns that have concentrations of scientific research and production, and specifically, refers to a small number of towns that have been recognised for their scientific capabilities and hence get special privileges.

Of the more general naukograds, about thirty are located in Moscow Oblast and the rest mainly in the Volga, Urals, and Siberian regions. Few are now "closed" — there are only ten closed nuclear towns where Russia's nuclear military work is still carried out. Some still have military connections, such as Fryazino, where advanced radio and electronics devices are developed, but most are now focusing on civilian work with the help of Western aid funds. Some naukograds are operated by the Russian Academy of Sciences, including Pushchino, a biological sciences center, and Chernogolovka, a center for physics and chemistry. Zelenograd (a city and an administrative district of Moscow located forty kilometres from the city centre) is the Russian center for research, education and production in the electronics area.

The first town to be officially designated "naukograd" in 2000 was Obninsk, a town with many nuclear and other special materials, meteorological and medical research facilities. Two others followed in 2001: Dubna, an international nuclear research centre and Korolyov, where many space research facilities are located. In 2003  Koltsovo, near Akademgorodok, originally the home of the biowarfare centre Vector but now a centre for pharmaceutical and medical research, Reutov, Fryazino, Michurinsk were also granted the status of naukograd. At least 14 towns have been granted the designation of naukograd.

See also
 Closed city
 List of closed cities
 College town

References

External links
 Secret Cities

 
Soviet culture
Science and technology in Russia
Science and technology in the Soviet Union
Closed cities
Soviet phraseology